Urdaneta Municipality may refer to any of the following places in Venezuela:

Urdaneta Municipality, Aragua, in the state of Aragua
Urdaneta Municipality, Lara, in the state of Lara
Urdaneta Municipality, Miranda, in the state of Miranda
Urdaneta Municipality, Trujillo, in the state of Trujillo

Municipality name disambiguation pages